Christina Wassen (born 12 January 1999) is a German diver.

She won a bronze medal in the 10 m mixed synchro platform competition at the 2018 European Aquatics Championships.

References

External links 
 

1999 births
Living people
German female divers
Divers at the 2020 Summer Olympics
Olympic divers of Germany
People from Eschweiler
Sportspeople from Cologne (region)
21st-century German women